Last Request is a 2006 American comedy written and directed by John DeBellis. The film features T.R. Knight, as a son who leaves the seminary responding to the last request of his father Danny Aiello to find a wife and prolong the family name.

Cast

T.R. Knight       as Jeff
Danny Aiello	   as Pop (Jeff’s father)
Mario Cantone     as Mr. Oliver
Frank Vincent     as Father Brice
Sabrina Lloyd     as Cathy
Joe Piscopo       as Angelo
Vincent Pastore   as Father Patton
Tony Lo Bianco	   as Monte
Barbara Feldon    as Mom (Jeff’s mother)
Mary Birdsong	   as Marlene
Gilbert Gottfried as Bum
Nick Scotti       as Tom
Mike Rutkoski	       as Mr. Pitiful
Virginia Williams as Nancy Dalton
Irma St. Paule    as Grandma
Bobby Alto	       as Dr. Davis
Tristan Carrasco      as The Godmother of Sex
Miranda Black         as Karen
Vinny Marz            as Shoemaker
Iris Almario          as Maria Luna
Greta Tyson           as Faye
Joseph DeBellis       as Senior Crunner
Adam Ferrara      as Cousin Frank
Mike Rutkoskie        as Mr. Pitiful
Joan Copeland     as Alice Rudolf
John Hoyt         as Big Joe
Bill Rutkoski         as Dr. Jiffy

References

External links
 

2006 films
American comedy films
2006 comedy films
2000s English-language films
2000s American films